The drug combination trimethoprim/polymyxin (INNs, trade name Polytrim) is an antimicrobial solution for topical ophthalmic use in the treatment of acute bacterial conjunctivitis and blepharoconjunctivitis.

References

Combination antibiotics
Bacterial dihydrofolate reductase inhibitors
Pyrimidines
Phenol ethers
Polymyxin antibiotics